Ernest Benjamin Lush (November 1, 1885 – February 26, 1937) was an outfielder in Major League Baseball. He played for the St. Louis Cardinals in 1910.

References

External links

1885 births
1937 deaths
Major League Baseball outfielders
St. Louis Cardinals players
Steubenville Stubs players
Lancaster Red Roses players
Niagara Purple Eagles baseball players
Baseball players from Connecticut
Sportspeople from Bridgeport, Connecticut